Jones High School may refer to one of the following high schools in the United States:

Jesse H. Jones High School — Houston, Texas
Jones High School (Florida) — Orlando, Florida
Jones County High School  — Gray, Georgia
Jones College Prep High School, Chicago, Illinois
Jones Senior High School — Trenton, North Carolina
Jones High School (Oklahoma) — Jones, Oklahoma
Scipio Jones High School — North Little Rock, Arkansas
Northeast Jones High School — Laurel, Mississippi
South Jones High School — Ellisville, Mississippi
West Jones High School — Laurel, Mississippi
Jones County High School — Murdo, South Dakota
A C Jones High School — Beeville, Texas